Lai-Ming Ching is a New Zealand cellular biology academic, and as of 2019 is a full professor at the University of Auckland.

Academic career

After gaining a PhD in 1978 and producing a doctoral thesis titled  'Analysis of clones of cytotoxic lymphocytes'  at the University of Auckland, Ching joined the staff, rising to full professor.

Much of Ching's research relates to the identification of potential anti-cancer drugs.

Selected works 
 Ching, Lai-Ming, and Bruce C. Baguley. "Induction of natural killer cell activity by the antitumour compound flavone acetic acid (NSC 347 512)." European Journal of Cancer and Clinical Oncology 23, no. 7 (1987): 1047–1050.
 Thomsen, Lindy L., Lai-Ming Ching, Li Zhuang, John B. Gavin, and Bruce C. Baguley. "Tumor-dependent increased plasma nitrate concentrations as an indication of the antitumor effect of flavone-8-acetic acid and analogues in mice." Cancer research 51, no. 1 (1991): 77–81.
 Roberts, Zachary J., Nadege Goutagny, Pin-Yu Perera, Hiroki Kato, Himanshu Kumar, Taro Kawai, Shizuo Akira et al. "The chemotherapeutic agent DMXAA potently and specifically activates the TBK1–IRF-3 signaling axis." Journal of Experimental Medicine 204, no. 7 (2007): 1559–1569.
 Thomsen, Lindy L., Lai-Ming Ching, and Bruce C. Baguley. "Evidence for the production of nitric oxide by activated macrophages treated with the antitumor agents flavone-8-acetic acid and xanthenone-4-acetic acid." Cancer research 50, no. 21 (1990): 6966–6970.

References

External links
 

Living people
New Zealand women academics
Year of birth missing (living people)
Academic staff of the University of Auckland
University of Auckland alumni
New Zealand medical researchers
New Zealand women writers